Antoine Richard "du Cantal" (4 February 1802 – 10 February 1891) was a French doctor, veterinarian, agronomist and politician.

Early years

Antoine Richard was born in Pierrefort, Cantal, on 4 February 1802.
He enlisted as a volunteer in the 1st Cuirassiers of the Guard and was sent to the École nationale vétérinaire d'Alfort (National Veterinary School of Alfort) as a military student.
In 1828 he was admitted as a veterinarian to the 1st Artillery.
He was stationed in Strasbourg, where he attended the Faculty of Medicine and obtained a degree as a doctor. 
He went to Algeria, then returned to Grignon to teach rural economy.

From 1832 Richard was a member of the Republican Society of the Rights of Man (Société des droits de l'homme).
In 1838 he founded an agricultural school in the Auvergne.
In 1840 he was appointed professor of natural history at the royal school of stud farming, and in 1844 he was made director of the school.
In 1845 he published the Annals of stud farming and agriculture, a monthly review.
In 1847 he published a remarkable work on equine conformation.
His scientific doctrines and democratic leanings made him suspect by the government, and he was dismissed in 1847.

Second republic

Richard threw himself into the Reform movement. 
After the February Revolution he was sent to Saint-Flour as Deputy Commissioner of the Provisional Government.
On 23 April 1848 he was elected to represent Cantal in the Constituent Assembly.
He joined the moderate left.
During the government of General Louis-Eugène Cavaignac (28 June 1848 to 20 December 1848) he was rapporteur of the agriculture and farm credit committee of the Assembly.
This committee reviewed the proposal by Agriculture Minister Charles Gilbert Tourret for agricultural education.
The committee proposed various amendments. Richard noted that cultivators had long been neglected by previous regimes, and presented the project as a great revolutionary measure. Richard added the objective of instilling love of the Republic to that of instilling love of the land.

Richard was re-elected for Cantal in the Legislative Assembly on 13 May 1849, sitting with the Democratic minority.

Later career

After the coup d'état of 2 December 1851 Richard returned to private life.
For the duration of the Second French Empire (1852–1870) he devoted himself to the study of agronomy. 
In 1854 he and Isidore Geoffroy Saint-Hilaire founded the Zoological Society of Acclimatization.
On 1 June 1863 he ran unsuccessfully as an independent candidate for election to the second district of Cantal.
In 1869 he was supported by the government in giving popular science lectures throughout France, which were very popular.
He died in Paris on 10 February 1891. He was aged 89.

Works

Robert's published works include:

References
Citations

Sources

1802 births
1891 deaths
French politicians